SS Unicorn was a British transatlantic paddle steamer built in 1836. After being bought in 1840, she was the first ship to sail with Cunard, traveling between the United Kingdom and Canada. She left the company in 1846, and would continue to operate under various owners until 1859, when she disappeared.

Description and service 
From what information is available, she was a 49.6m (162 feet, 8 3/4 inches) long express ship with a wooden hull which measured 650 gross register tons, and was 390 net register tons. She had a beam of 23.5 feet (7.16 metres) and a depth of 17.3 feet (5.27 metres). She had accommodations for 51 cabin class passengers and 190 steerage passengers.

Unicorn was built by Robert Steele & Company in Greenock and launched in May 1836. She had two sister ships: Eagle and City of Glasgow. Unicorn, along with her sisters, originally served under George & John Burns (Glasgow & Liverpool Steam Shipping Co.), sailing the Glasgow-Liverpool route. In 1840,  she was purchased by Samuel Cunard for the newly formed Cunard Line, becoming the first ship to sail with the company. After entering service with Cunard, Unicorn initially sailed along the Halifax-Pictou-Quebec route before switching to Liverpool-Halifax-Boston route. In November 1843, she was involved in rescuing passengers and crew from Premier, a sailing ship that was wrecked in the St. Lawrence. In 1845, she received a major refit on the River Clyde.

After leaving Cunard in 1846, she briefly served as a corvette in the Portuguese Navy. From 1849 to 1853, she operated under the Pacific Mail Steamship Co. and would make trips from San Francisco to Panama. After that, she was put up for sale in Australia before going on to operate in Chinese waters. In 1857, she was renamed E. H. Green. In May 1859, she disappeared without a trace.

References 

1836 ships
Ships built in Scotland
Passenger ships of the United Kingdom